Stephen Amritraj (born March 28, 1984) is an American former professional tennis player, who represented India in international tournaments. He is the nephew of Vijay Amritraj, and son of Anand Amritraj.

Amritraj is the son of former world tour player Anand Amritraj and paternal cousin of fellow former pro Prakash Amritraj, who also represented India. He played high school tennis at Crespi Carmelite High School in Encino, California, and NCAA college tennis for Duke University.

Amritraj's career high singles ranking is world No. 973, which he reached in June 2007.

Amritraj is married to American professional tennis player Alison Riske.

References

External links
 
 
 USTA Junior Spotlight - Jan. 28, 2002

1984 births
Living people
People from Calabasas, California
Tennis players from Los Angeles
American male tennis players
Indian male tennis players
American people of Indian Tamil descent
American sportspeople of Indian descent
Indian-American tennis players
Duke University alumni
Duke Blue Devils men's tennis players
American expatriates in India
Tamil sportspeople
Amritraj family